This One's for You is the sixth album by R&B crooner Teddy Pendergrass. It was released just after a bad car accident Pendergrass was involved in, which left him paralyzed from the waist down due to a spinal cord injury. The album did not do as well as his previous albums did on the Billboard 200, peaking at only #59, but it did do well on the R&B album chart, reaching #6. Only one single was released, "I Can't Win for Losing", which peaked at only #32 on the R&B charts.

Track listing
 "I Can't Win for Losing" 4:16 (Victor Carstarphen, Gene McFadden, John Whitehead)
 "This One's for You" 6:18 (Barry Manilow, Marty Panzer)
 "Loving You Was Good" 3:35 (LeRoy Bell, Casey James)
 "This Gift of Life" 4:27 (Kenny Gamble, Leon Huff)
 "Now Tell Me That You Love Me" 5:15 (Gamble, Huff)
 "It's Up to You (What You Do With Your Life)" 5:37 (Gamble, Huff)
 "Don't Leave Me out Along the Road" 3:34 (Richard Roebuck)
 "Only to You" 3:53 (Nickolas Ashford, Valerie Simpson)

References

1982 albums
Teddy Pendergrass albums
Albums produced by Kenneth Gamble
Albums produced by Leon Huff
Albums produced by Thom Bell
Albums produced by Ashford & Simpson
Albums arranged by Bobby Martin
Albums recorded at Sigma Sound Studios
Philadelphia International Records albums